Rebecca Simpson (born 2 December 1982) is an association football player who represented New Zealand at international level.

Simpson made her Football Ferns début in a 0–2 loss to Australia on 18 February 2004, and finished her international career with seven caps to her credit.

References

1982 births
Living people
New Zealand women's international footballers
New Zealand women's association footballers
Women's association footballers not categorized by position